Hong Sa-ik (hangul 홍사익;hanja 洪思翊; 4 March 1889 – 26 September 1946), and was also known by the Japanese pronunciation of his name - Kō Shiyoku (Japanese: 洪 思翊) or Kou Shiyoku, was a lieutenant general in the Imperial Japanese Army, and the top-ranking ethnic Korean in Japan to be charged with war crimes relating to the conduct of the Empire of Japan in World War II.

A graduate of the Imperial Japanese Army Academy, Hong was placed in command of the Japanese camps holding Allied (primarily U.S. and Filipino) prisoners of war in the Philippines during the latter part of World War II, where many of the camp guards were of Korean ethnicity.

Hong was held responsible for all the atrocities committed by Imperial Japanese Army prison guards against Allied POWs in Philippines, and was hanged in 1946.

Early career
Hong, a member of the Namyang Hong clan, was born in 1889 to a yangban family in Anseong, Gyeonggi-do. In 1905, as the Eulsa Treaty was being signed, he entered into the military academy of the Korean Empire. With the abolishment of the academy in 1909, he transferred to Japan's  as a government-financed student along with Crown Prince Yi Eun on the orders of dethroned Emperor Gojong. 

Soon after, he advanced to the Imperial Japanese Army Academy. At that time, there were several students from the Empire of Korea enrolled at the military academy, and with the shock of the 1910 annexation of Korea by Japan, a few left the Academy to join in the movements for Korean independence, but most followed the lead of Ji Cheong-cheon, who argued that they should leave to fight only after having studied and developed their skills. A few, such as Hong, attempted to stay aloof from either movement, and largely parted ways with his classmates.

In 1914, Hong graduated in the 26th class of the Academy and was commissioned as a lieutenant into the Imperial Japanese Army, and in 1923 graduated from the Army War College. However, despite this, he secretly maintained his friendship with Ji and other anti-Japanese activists in the Korean Liberation Army, and even supported Ji's family with his own funds, an action which could have put Hong himself in danger if he made even a small mistake.

Rising through the ranks

With the implementation of the sōshi-kaimei policy, Hong was under strong pressure to change his Korean name to a Japanese-style name, but he ignored the pressure and in the end did not change his name and kept his surname as Hong.

Hong continued to demonstrate exceptional ability and was rapidly promoted through the ranks, eventually rising to the rank of lieutenant general. From 1939-40, he was with the China Expeditionary Army. From 1940-41, he was assigned to the 1st Depot Division, and in 1941, he became the commander of the IJA 108th Infantry Brigade as a major general. 

In March 1944, he went to the Philippines to command all prisoner-of-war camps. He was promoted to lieutenant general in October of the same year, and remained in the Philippines under the 14th Area Army until the cessation of hostilities.

Trial and execution
After the war, Hong was tried in Manila before a military tribunal by the Allies over the conduct of his prison guards while he was commandant. The Manila tribunal sentenced Hong to death as a war criminal on 18 April 1946. He was executed by hanging on 28 September 1946.

Later views
After Korea regained its independence, Hong's family became the target of blame and ostracism by various factions in Korea. His eldest son, Hong Guk-seon, graduated from Japan's Waseda University and afterwards worked in the Bank of Chōsen, but was removed from his position on the orders of Syngman Rhee. He and his mother, Hong's widow, later emigrated to the United States.

Bibliography

References

1889 births
1946 deaths
People from Anseong
Converts to Christianity
Executed military personnel
Korean Christians
Imperial Korean Army Cadets
Japanese generals
Korean collaborators with Imperial Japan
Military history of Korea during World War II
Japanese people executed for war crimes
Japanese people executed abroad
Japanese people of Korean descent
Executed Korean people
Japanese military leaders
People executed by the United States military by hanging
Executed collaborators with Imperial Japan